Henri Meilhac (23 February 1830 – 6 July 1897) was a French dramatist and opera librettist, best known for his collaborations with Ludovic Halévy on Georges Bizet's Carmen and on the works of Jacques Offenbach, as well as Jules Massenet's Manon.

Biography
Meilhac was born in the 1st arrondissement of Paris in 1830. As a young man, he began writing fanciful articles for Parisian newspapers and comédies en vaudevilles, in a vivacious boulevardier spirit which brought him to the forefront. About 1860, Meilhac met Ludovic Halévy, and their collaboration for the stage lasted twenty years.

Their most famous collaboration is the libretto for Georges Bizet's Carmen.  However, Meilhac's work is most closely tied to the music of Jacques Offenbach, for whom he wrote over a dozen librettos, most of them together with Halévy. The most successful collaborations with Offenbach are La belle Hélène (1864), Barbe-bleue (1866), La Vie parisienne (1866), La Grande-Duchesse de Gérolstein (1867), and La Périchole (1868).

Other librettos by Meilhac include Jules Massenet's Manon (with Philippe Gille) (1884), Hervé's Mam'zelle Nitouche (1883), and Rip, the French version of Robert Planquette's operetta Rip Van Winkle (also with Gille).  Their vaudeville play Le réveillon was the basis of the operetta Die Fledermaus.

In 1888, Meilhac was elected to the Académie française. He died in Paris in 1897.

Works 

1856: La Sarabande du cardinal, one-act comedy with couplets, created at the Théâtre du Palais-Royal, 29 May.
1856: Satania, comedy in 2 acts with couplets, Théâtre du Palais-Royal, 10 October.
 Garde-toi, je me garde, comédie en vaudeville in 2 acts, Théâtre du Palais-Royal.
1857: Le Copiste, comedy in 1 act and in prose, Théâtre du Gymnase, 3 August.
1858: Péché caché, ou A quelque chose malheur est bon, one-act comedy, Théâtre du Palais-Royal, 11 January.
1858: L'Autographe, one-act comedy, Théâtre du Gymnase, 27 November.
1859: Un petit-fils de Mascarille, comedy in 5 acts and in prose, Théâtre du Gymnase, 8 October.
1859: Le Retour de l'Italie, à-propos (short theatre play) Théâtre du Gymnase, 14 August.
1860: Ce qui plaît aux hommes, comedy in 1 act (with Ludovic Halévy), Théâtre des Variétés, 6 October.
1860: Une heure avant l'ouverture, prologue in 1 act, with songs, Théâtre du Vaudeville, 31 December.
1860: L'Étincelle, one-act comedy, Théâtre du Vaudeville, 31 December.
1861: Le Menuet de Danaë, comédie en vaudeville in 1 act (with Ludovic Halévy), Théâtre des Variétés, 20 April.
1861: La Vertu de Célimène, comedy in 5 acts, Théâtre du Gymnase, 1 May.
1861: L'Attaché d'ambassade, comedy in 3 acts, Théâtre du Vaudeville in October (this play served as basis for the operetta The Merry Widow, libretto by Leo Stein and Victor Léon, music by Franz Lehar).
 Le Café du roi, opéra comique in 1 act, music by Louis Deffès.
1862: L'Échéance, comédy in 1 act (with Arthur Delavigne), Théâtre du Gymnase, 15 March.
1862: Les Moulins à vent, comedy in 3 acts with couplets (with Ludovic Halévy), Théâtre des Variétés, 22 February.
1862: Les Brebis de Panurge, one-act comedy (with Ludovic Halévy), Théâtre du Vaudeville, 24 November.
1862: La Clé de Métella, one-act comedy (with Ludovic Halévy), Théâtre du Vaudeville, 24 November.
1861: Les Bourguignonnes, one-act opéra comique, music by Louis Deffès, Opéra-comique, 16 July.
1863: Le Brésilien, one-act comedy (with Ludovic Halévy), music by Jacques Offenbach, Théâtre du Palais-Royal, 9 May
1863: Le Train de minuit, two-act comedy (with Ludovic Halévy), Théâtre du Gymnase, 15 June.
1864: La Belle Hélène, opéra-bouffe in 3 acts (with Ludovic Halévy), music by Jacques Offenbach, Théâtre des Variétés, 17 December.
1864: Fiammetta, ballet-pantomime in 2 acts (with Ludovic Halévy and Arthur Saint-Léon), music by Léon Minkus, Moscou, Ballet de Bolshoi, 12 (24) novembre 1863; entitled Néméa, ou l'Amour vengé - Paris, Académie impériale de musique, 11 July.
1864: Les Curieuses, one-act comedy (with Arthur Delavigne), Théâtre du Gymnase, 17 October.
1864: Le Photographe, one-act comédie en vaudeville (with Ludovic Halévy), Théâtre du Palais-Royal, 24 December.
1865: Fabienne, comedy in 3 acts, Théâtre du Gymnase, 1 September.
1865: Le Singe de Nicolet, one-act comedy with singing (with Ludovic Halévy), Théâtre des Variétés, 29 January.
1865: Les Méprises de Lambinet, one-act comedy with couplets (with Ludovic Halévy), Théâtre des Variétés, 3 December.
1866: Barbe-bleue, opéra bouffe in 3 acts and 4 tableaux (with Ludovic Halévy), music by Jacques Offenbach, Théâtre des Variétés, 5 February
1866: José Maria, three-act opéra comique (with Eugène Cormon), music by Jules Cohen, Opéra-Comique, 16 July.
1866: La Vie parisienne, opéra bouffe in 5 acts (with Ludovic Halévy), music by Jacques Offenbach, Théâtre du Palais-Royal, 31 October
1867: La Grande-Duchesse de Gérolstein, opéra bouffe in 3 acts and 4 tableaux (with Ludovic Halévy), music by Jacques Offenbach, Théâtre des Variétés, 12 April
1867: Tout pour les dames, comédie en vaudeville in 1 act (with Ludovic Halévy), Théâtre des Variétés, 8 September
1868: L'Élixir du docteur Cornelius, operetta (with Arthur Delavigne), music by Émile Durand, Fantaisies-Parisiennes, 3 February
1868: La Pénitente, one-act opéra comique (with William Busnach), music by Mme de Grandval, Opéra-Comique, 13 March.
1868: Le Château à Toto, opéra bouffe in 3 acts (with Ludovic Halévy), music by Jacques Offenbach, Théâtre du Palais-Royal, 6 May.
1868: Garde-toi, je me garde, comedy in 1 act with songs, revived at the théâtre des Variétés 28 June 1868 (Théâtre du Palais-Royal in 1856).
1868: Fanny Lear, comedy in 5 acts (with Ludovic Halévy), Théâtre du Gymnase, 13 August.
1868: La Périchole, opéra bouffe in 2 acts (with Ludovic Halévy), music by Jacques Offenbach, Théâtre des Variétés, 6 October.
1868: Suzanne et les deux vieillards, comedy in 1 act, Théâtre du Gymnase, 10 Octobre.
1868: Le Bouquet, comedy in 1 act (with Ludovic Halévy), Théâtre du Palais-Royal, 23 October.
1869: Vert-Vert, opéra comique in 3 acts (with Charles Nuitter), music by Jacques Offenbach, Opéra-Comique, 10 March.
1869: La Diva, opéra bouffe in 3 acts (with Ludovic Halévy), music by Jacques Offenbach, Théâtre des Bouffes-Parisiens, 22 March.
1869: Frou-Frou, comedy in 5 acts (with Ludovic Halévy), Théâtre du Gymnase, 30 October, published in 1870 by Michel Lévy frères Read online.
1869: L'Homme à la clé, comedy in 1 act (with Ludovic Halévy), Théâtre des Variétés, 11 August.
1869: Les Brigands, opéra bouffe in 3 acts (with Ludovic Halévy), music by Jacques Offenbach, Théâtre des Variétés, 10 December.
1871: Tricoche et Cacolet, comédie en vaudeville in 5 acts (with Ludovic Halévy), Théâtre du Palais-Royal, 6 December.
1872: Madame attend Monsieur, comedy in 1 act (with Ludovic Halévy), Théâtre des Variétés, 8 February.
1872: Le Réveillon, comedy in 3 acts (with Ludovic Halévy), Théâtre du Palais-Royal, 10 September (this play served as a basis for the operetta Die Fledermaus, libretto by Richard Genée and Karl Haffner, music by Johann Strauss II).
1872: Les Sonnettes, comedy in 1 act in prose (with Ludovic Halévy), Théâtre des Variétés, 15 November.
1873: Le Roi Candaule, one-act comedy in prose (with Ludovic Halévy), Théâtre du Palais-Royal, 9 April.
1873: L’Été de la Saint-Martin, one-act comedy in prose (with Ludovic Halévy), Comédie-Française, 1 July.
1873: Toto chez Tata, one-act comedy (with Ludovic Halévy), Théâtre des Variétés 25 August.
1874: La Petite Marquise, three-act comedy (with Ludovic Halévy), Théâtre des Variétés, 13 February.
1874: La Mi-carême, folie-vaudeville in 1 act (with Ludovic Halévy), Théâtre des Variétés, 2 April.
1874: L'Ingénue, one-act comedy (with Ludovic Halévy), Théâtre des Variétés, 24 September.
1874: La Veuve, comedy in 3 acts (with Ludovic Halévy), Théâtre du Gymnase, 5 November.
1874: La Boule, comedy in 4 acts (with Ludovic Halévy), Théâtre du Palais-Royal, 24 November.
1875: Carmen, opéra comique in four acts (with Ludovic Halévy), music by Georges Bizet, Opéra-Comique, 3 March.
1875: Le Passage de Vénus, "leçon d'astronomie" in 1 act (with Ludovic Halévy), Théâtre des Variétés, 4 May.
1875: La boulangère a des écus, opéra bouffe in 3 acts (with Ludovic Halévy), music by Jacques Offenbach, Théâtre des Variétés, 5 August.
1876: Loulou, folie-vaudeville in 1 act (with Ludovic Halévy), Théâtre du Palais-Royal, 31 March.
1876: Le Prince, comedy in 4 acts (with Ludovic Halévy), Théâtre du Palais-Royal, 25 November.
 (year unknown) Paturel, comedy in 1 act.
1877: La Cigale, comedy in 3 acts (with Ludovic Halévy), Théâtre des Variétés, 6 October.
1877: Le Fandango, ballet-pantomime in 1 act (with Ludovic Halévy and Louis Mérante), Opéra de Paris, 26 November.
1878: Le Petit Duc, opéra-comique in 3 acts (with Ludovic Halévy), music by Charles Lecocq, Théâtre de la Renaissance, 25 January.
1878: La Cigarette, comedy in 1 act (with Charles Narrey), Gymnase-Dramatique, 20 April.
1879: Le Mari de la débutante, comedy in 4 acts (with Ludovic Halévy), Théâtre du Palais-Royal, 5 February.
1879: Le Petit Hôtel, comedy in 1 act in prose (with Ludovic Halévy), Comédie-Française, 21 February.
1879: La Petite Mademoiselle, opéra comique in 3 acts (with Ludovic Halévy), music by Charles Lecocq, Théâtre de la Renaissance, 12 April.
1879: Lolotte, comedy in 1 act (with Ludovic Halévy), Théâtre du Vaudeville, 4 October.
1880: La Petite Mère, comedy in 3 acts (with Ludovic Halévy), Théâtre des Variétés, 6 March.
1880: Nina la tueuse, comedy in 1 act in verse (with Jacques Redelsperg), Théâtre du Gymnase, 2 October.
1881: Janot, opéra-comique in 3 acts (with Ludovic Halévy), music by Charles Lecocq, Théâtre de la Renaissance, 22 January.
1881: La Roussotte, comédie en vaudeville, music by Hervé, Charles Lecocq, and Marius Boullard, libretto by Ludovic Halévy, Henri Meilhac and Albert Millaud, Théâtre des Variétés, 28 January.
1881: Le Mari à Babette, comedy in 3 acts (with Philippe Gille), Théâtre du Palais-Royal, 31 December.
1882: Madame le diable, féerie-opérette in 4 acts and 12 tableaux including a prologue (with Arnold Mortier), music by Gaston Serpette, Théâtre de la Renaissance, 4 April.
1883: Mam'zelle Nitouche, comédie en vaudeville in 3 acts (with Albert Millaud, Théâtre des Variétés, 26 January.
1883 Le Nouveau régime, one-act comedy (with Jules Prével), Théâtre du Gymnase, 11 May.
1883 Ma camarade, five-act play (with Philippe Gille), Théâtre du Palais-Royal, 9 October.
1884: Manon, opéra comique in 5 acts and 6 tableaux (with Philippe Gille), music by Jules Massenet, Opéra-comique, 19 January.
1884: Le Cosaque, opéra bouffe (with Albert Millaud and Ernest Blum), music by Hervé, Théâtre des Variétés, 26 January.
1884: La Duchesse Martin, one-act comedy, Comédie-Française, 16 May.
1884: Rip, opéra comique in 3 acts (with Philippe Gille after Henry Brougham Farnie's English-language Rip Van Winkle), music by Robert Planquette, Folies-Dramatiques, 11 November.
1886: Les Demoiselles Clochart.
1886: Gotte, comedy in 4 acts, Théâtre du Palais-Royal, 2 December.
 La lettre de Toto, monologue in verse.
1888: Décoré, comedy in 3 acts, Théâtre des Variétés, 27 January.
1888: Pepa, comedy in 3 acts (with Louis Ganderax), Comédie-Française, 31 October.
 Le Train de minuit.
1890: Margot, comedy in 3 acts, Comédie-Française, 18 January.
1890: Ma cousine, comedy in 3 acts, Théâtre des Variétés, 27 October.
 M. l'Abbé.
 Brevet supérieur.
1893: Kassya, opera in 5 acts (with Philippe Gille, after Leopold von Sacher-Masoch), music by Léo Delibes, Opéra-Comique, 13 March.
1894: Villégiature, comedy in 1 act, Théâtre du Vaudeville, 15 January.

Filmography
Films based on Carmen
Films based on Die Fledermaus (The operetta Die Fledermaus is based on the play Le Reveillon)
Films based on The Merry Widow (The operetta The Merry Widow is based on the play L'Attaché d'ambassade)
Films based on Mam'zelle Nitouche
A Hungry Heart, directed by Émile Chautard (1917, based on the play Frou-Frou)
Fanny Lear, directed by Robert Boudrioz and Jean Manoussi (France, 1919, based on the play Fanny Lear)
Frou-Frou, directed by Otto Rippert (Germany, 1922, based on the play Frou-Frou)
Frou-Frou, directed by Guy du Fresnay (France, 1924, based on the play Frou-Frou)
So This Is Paris, directed by Ernst Lubitsch (1926, based on the play Le Reveillon)
La Vie parisienne, directed by Robert Siodmak (France, 1936, based on the operetta La Vie parisienne)
Parisian Life, directed by Robert Siodmak (English version, 1936, based on the operetta La Vie parisienne)
The Toy Wife, directed by Richard Thorpe (1938, based on the play Frou-Frou)
Tricoche and Cacolet, directed by Pierre Colombier (France, 1938, based on the play Tricoche et Cacolet)
Sköna Helena, directed by Gustaf Edgren (Sweden, 1951, based on the operetta La belle Hélène)
Die schöne Helena, directed by Axel von Ambesser (West Germany, 1975, TV film, based on the operetta La belle Hélène)
Parisian Life, directed by Christian-Jaque (France, 1977, based on the operetta La Vie parisienne)

External links
 

1831 births
1897 deaths
Writers from Paris
French opera librettists
Operetta librettists
Members of the Académie Française
French musical theatre lyricists
19th-century French dramatists and playwrights
Burials at Montmartre Cemetery
19th-century French male writers
French male dramatists and playwrights